Mystery Guest is Taiwanese Mandopop artist Yoga Lin's debut Mandarin studio album. It was released 3 June 2008 by HIM International Music with a bonus DVD containing making-of footage and "神秘嘉賓" (Mystery Guest) music video.

A second edition Mystery Guest (Labyrinth Collectible Edition) (神秘嘉賓 重返迷宮影音珍藏版) was released on 4 July 2008. The music video for title track "神秘嘉賓" (Mystery Guest) features Taiwanese actress Chen Kuangyi.

Reception
The tracks "伯樂" (Admirer), "神秘嘉賓" (Mystery Guest) and "眼色" (Color of Your Eyes) are listed at number 10, 20 and 38 respectively on Hit Fm Taiwan's Hit Fm Annual Top 100 Singles Chart (Hit-Fm年度百首單曲) for 2008. The title track, "神秘嘉賓" (Mystery Guest) won one of the Top 10 Songs of the Year at the 2009 HITO Radio Music Awards presented by Taiwanese radio station Hit FM.

The album was awarded one of the Top 10 Selling Mandarin Albums of the Year at the 2008 IFPI Hong Kong Album Sales Awards, presented by the Hong Kong branch of IFPI.

In 2009, the album was nominated for four awards at the 20th Golden Melody Awards, including Best New Artist for Lin for his work on this album It was awarded Best Single Producer for "眼色" (Color of Your Eyes).

Track listing

Charts

Awards and nominations

References

External links
  Yoga Lin discography@HIM International Music

2008 debut albums
Yoga Lin albums
HIM International Music albums